Not My Time is a pop song by the Spectra 2015 Singers. 100% of net proceeds from the recording benefit the Rainbow Association of Canadian Artists (RACA) and the Cancer Society.

This song was co-written by RACA Executive Director Ralph Hamelmann, ZEDD Records producer Mark Zubek and Gemini Award-winner Paul Bellini. It was available for pre-orders on May 7, 2015 and released on June 22, 2015.

Inspiration for “Not My Time" 
In 2014, Hamelmann's mother (Sylvia Hynes) beat bowel cancer despite being given a 30% to 50% chance of surviving.  According to Hamelmann, "I wanted to write a song that would inspire others in her situation."

Reception 
Peter Edwards of the Toronto Star described "Not My Time" as "a powerful anthem in the fight against cancer."

Q107 CILQ-FM described it as "(a) powerful anti-cancer music video."

100.5 Fresh Radio CKRU-FM described the music video as "inspirational."

Chart performance  
Within hours of its release, "Not My Time" reached #1 on the iTunes Canada Easy Listening Chart.

Rob Ford Appearance 
On the Radio Edit of "Not My Time", former Toronto Mayor Rob Ford sings the last line and makes a brief appearance in the music video.

Ford was diagnosed with pleomorphic liposarcoma cancer in 2014, and went in for surgery on May 11, 2015. In a statement, Ford asked "everyone to put their politics aside and stand behind the causes this song represents."

According to Hamelmann: “Given Rob Ford's current bout with the disease, his celebrity status, and his previous work with Canadian musicians, he was an obvious choice for this project."

Music video 
An official music video produced and directed by Hamelmann was released on www.notmytime.ca and YouTube on May 6, 2015.

It features the vocalists in various roles such as a boxer, cancer patient, and karate fighter. The singers also appear in footage shot during their recording sessions.

The video also features a topless breast cancer survivor holding a sign that reads:  “Cancer took my breasts…Not my Life.”

The “Not My Time Challenge”  
On May 15, 2015 RACA launched the “Not My Time Challenge."    Participants were asked to film themselves singing the chorus of "Not My Time" and post these videos to social media.

Participating vocalists 
The Spectra 2015 Singers are an ensemble of indie recording artists that participated in the 2015 season of Spectra Talent Contest. This includes following singers (in order of appearance):  Rayelle, Vijay Mohan, Beatrice, Liron, Alexa Muir, Elad, Lauren Hoyles, Sammie Gamble, Julia Gartha, Jeff Matthew, and Amy Clara. Additional vocals were provided by Ralph Hamelmann and Rob Ford.

Previous RACA recordings (by the Spectra Singers) 
In 2014, Hamelmann, Zubek and Bellini penned "Without Words," a recording in support of the Ontario Society for the Prevention of Cruelty to Animals.  Performed by the Spectra 2014 Singers, this song reached #1 on the iTunes Canada Easy Listening Chart.

In 2013, Hamelmann and Bellini worked with Juno Award-winning producer Gavin Bradley on "If You're Not Here At Christmas." This holiday song performed by the Spectra Singers was certified gold by Music Canada.

References

General references

2015 songs
Charity singles